Yunuslar can refer to:

 Yunuslar, Burhaniye
 Yunuslar, Dursunbey, a village in Turkey
 Yunuslar, Gerede, a village in Turkey
 Yunuslar (Tram İzmir), a light-rail station